The Hill City Christian Church (previously Capital City Christian Church) in Boise, Idaho is a historic church at 9th and Franklin Streets.  The Romanesque-style church was built in 1910-1911 and individually listed on the National Register of Historic Places in 1978. In 1982 it was included as a contributing property in the Fort Street Historic District.

It was deemed "architecturally significant as a good example of the brick Romanesque style applied to an ecclesiastical building. Following the Joplin plan, a standard Christian church design of the period, it is similar to other Christian churches throughout the nation, including the one in Eugene, Oregon. Its hexagonal dome, offset by the two large gables, is rare in Idaho and makes the building a landmark. The stained glass windows are of high quality and exhibit good craftsmanship, as does the interior woodwork. The Balcom and Vaughan theater organ, manufactured in Seattle, is one of the two extant vacuum operated theater organs in Boise (the other is in the Ada Theater)."

Stonework was by mason Charles Storey, who also worked on Boise's St. John's cathedral and the State Capitol.

References

Christian organizations established in 1910
Churches on the National Register of Historic Places in Idaho
Romanesque Revival church buildings in Idaho
Churches completed in 1911
Churches in Boise, Idaho
1910 establishments in Idaho
National Register of Historic Places in Boise, Idaho
Individually listed contributing properties to historic districts on the National Register in Idaho